Chymomyza costata is a species of fly in the family Drosophilidae. It is found in the  Palearctic.

References

Drosophilidae
Insects described in 1838
Muscomorph flies of Europe